Rancharia is a municipality in the state of São Paulo in Brazil. The population is 29,726 (2020 est.) in an area of 1586 km². The elevation is 519 m.

References

Municipalities in São Paulo (state)